This is a list of universities in Honduras.

Escuela Agrícola Panamericana Zamorano
Escuela Nacional de Ciencias Forestales
Universidad Católica de Honduras
Universidad Católica Nuestra Señora Reina de La Paz
Universidad Cristiana de Honduras
Universidad de San Pedro Sula
Universidad Evangélica
Universidad Jesús de Nazareth
Universidad José Cecilio del Valle
Universidad Metropolitana de Honduras
Universidad Nacional Autónoma de Honduras
Universidad Nacional de Agricultura
Universidad Tecnológica Centroamericana (UNITEC)
Universidad Tecnológica de Honduras

See also
 

Universities
Honduras
Honduras
Universities